391 Ingeborg (prov. designation:  or ) is an asteroid and second-largest Mars-crosser on an eccentric orbit from the asteroid belt. It was discovered by German astronomer Max Wolf on 1 November 1894, at the Heidelberg Observatory in southwest Germany. When discovered, it was observed for a couple of weeks, and follow-up observations were made in 1901 and 1904. Any reference of the asteroid's name to a person is unknown.

Orbit and classification 

Ingeborg orbits the Sun in the inner main-belt at a distance of 1.6–3.0 AU once every 3 years and 6 months (1,291 days). Its orbit has an eccentricity of 0.31 and an inclination of 23° with respect to the ecliptic.

Naming 

Any reference of this minor planet's name to a person or occurrence is unknown.

Unknown meaning 

Among the many thousands of named minor planets, Ingeborg is one of 120 asteroids, for which no official naming citation has been published.

Physical characteristics

Diameter and albedo 

According to the surveys carried out by the Japanese Akari satellite and the NEOWISE mission of NASA's Wide-field Infrared Survey Explorer, Ingeborg measures between 15.75 and 18.15 kilometers in diameter and its surface has an albedo between 0.282 and 0.495. The Collaborative Asteroid Lightcurve Link assumes an albedo of 0.20 and calculates a diameter of 19.63 kilometers based on an absolute magnitude of 10.9. Other large Mars crossing minor planets include 132 Aethra (43 km), 323 Brucia (36 km), and 2204 Lyyli (25 km).

References

External links 
  AstDys entry on 391 Ingeborg
 Lightcurve plot of (391) Ingeborg, Antelope Hills Observatory
 Asteroid Lightcurve Database (LCDB), query form (info )
 Dictionary of Minor Planet Names, Google books
 Asteroids and comets rotation curves, CdR – Geneva Observatory, Raoul Behrend
 Discovery Circumstances: Numbered Minor Planets (1)-(5000) – Minor Planet Center
 
 

000391
Discoveries by Max Wolf
Named minor planets
000391
000391
18941101